Devour is the fourth studio album by musician Margaret Chardiet under her music project Pharmakon. It was released by Sacred Bones Records on August 30, 2019.

The first single from the album Self-Regulating System was released on July 9, 2019.

Critical reception
Devour was met with universal acclaim from critics. At Metacritic, which assigns a weighted average rating out of 100 to reviews from mainstream publications, this release received an average score of 83, based on 10 reviews.

Accolades

Track listing

References

2019 albums
Sacred Bones Records albums